Obukhiv is a city in Kyiv Oblast (province) of Ukraine and the administrative center of Obukhiv Raion. It hosts the administration of Obukhiv urban hromada, one of the hromadas of Ukraine. Population: . In 2001, the population was 32,776.

The city has a Holodomor memorial and in 2009 the municipal administration took down the Lenin monument which was repeatedly vandalized. It is 178 km south - southeast of Chernobyl.

Until 18 July 2020, Obukhiv was incorporated as a city of oblast significance and the center of Obukhiv Municipality. It also served as the center of Obukhiv Raion even though it did not belong to the raion. In July 2020, as part of the administrative reform of Ukraine, which reduced the number of raions of Kyiv Oblast to seven, Obukhiv Municipality was merged into Obukhiv Raion.

Geography
Obukhiv has a dry sub-humid (0.5 - 0.65 p/pet) climate. The land area is not cultivated, but most of the natural vegetation remains intact. The landscape is mainly covered with mosaic vegetation/croplands. The climate is classified as humid continental (humid with severe winter, no dry season with a cool temperate moist forest bio-zone. The soil in the area is high in chernozems, phaeozems, greyzems (ch), dark colored, deep soils in organic matter, calcareous lower in profile, also typical of grass steppe/prairie.

Climate
July is the warmest with an average temperature of 24.8 °C at noon. January is coldest with an average temperature of -8.3 °C at night. Obukhiv has distinct cold and warm seasons, like cold winters and warm summers. The temperatures at night are cooler than during the daytime.

Winter has prolonged freezing periods, with the coldest month most often being December. July is on average the month with the most sunshine. Rainfall and other precipitation have no distinct peak month.

Culture

September 15th is the Day of Obukhiv.

Government
Oleksandr Levchenko was elected mayor in March 2012 (with 38.6% of the total vote); thanks to a low voter turnout of 43% with only 4,500. In the 2010 local elections Levchenko's Party of Regions also won most seats in the 46 seats city council (18 with 39,1%), followed by UDAR of Vitaliy Klychko (11 with 23,9%).

Levchenko was reelected as mayor in the October 2020 Ukrainian local elections with 51.5% of the votes as a candidate of the Servant of the People.)

Transportation

Major Roads

Airports
No major airports are close to the city.

International relations

Twin towns – Sister cities
Obukhiv is twinned with:
  Radebeul, Saxony Germany

Notable people
Andriy Mostovyi, the Midfield of the club Desna Chernihiv playing in Ukrainian Premier League.

Gallery

References

External links 
 myobukhiv.com - information about local government and businesses in Obukhiv (in Russian and Ukrainian)

Cities in Kyiv Oblast
Cities of regional significance in Ukraine
Kyiv metropolitan area
Kievsky Uyezd
Obukhiv Raion